The Larzac tablet is a lead curse tablet found in 1983 in the commune of L'Hospitalet-du-Larzac, Aveyron, southern France. It is now kept in the museum of Millau. It bears one of the most important inscriptions in the Gaulish language.

The inscription is in Roman cursive on a lead tablet preserved in two fragments, dated to about 100 AD. 
It is the longest preserved Gaulish text, extending to more than 1000 letters or 160 words (an unknown number of lines at the end of the text are lost). The curse tablet was excavated from a grave of La Vayssière necropolis, just north of the village of L'Hospitalet-du-Larzac,  close to the ancient Roman road from Condatomagus (Amiliavum, Millau) to Luteva (Lodève), at the time crossing the provincial border between Gallia Aquitania and Gallia Narbonensis.

The text cannot be translated with any certainty, but it is clear that its nature is that of a magical curse, cast in the "world of women", presumably by one group of women or sorceresses against a rival group.
The placement of the curse tablet in a tomb is not unusual in the Greco-Roman world; the tomb was considered a gateway by means of which the curse would reach the infernal deities charged with its execution. The fragmentation of the tablet may also be intentional, performed by its original authors, as part of the ritual "burial" of the curse to send it on its way to the underworld.
The magic invoked is clearly malicious, of a nature well attested from other parts of the Celtic world, notably Irish mythology.
Sisterhoods of sorceresses or witches are also known to have existed in ancient Gaul on the authority of ancient ethnographers; thus, Pomponius Mela (III, 6, 48) records a college of nine priestesses capable of invoking tempests and adopting animal form among the Osismii, while Strabon (IV, 4, 6) is aware of a convent of women of the Samnitae possessed by Dionysus,  installed on an island of the Loire estuary.

Both the context of the curse tablet and the names of the women listed as targets of the curse reflect the  syncretic culture of Roman Gaul at the end of the 1st century. The name of Severa Tertionicna, the "head witch" targeted by the curse, consists of a Roman cognomen Severa and a patronymic which combines the Roman cognomen Tertio with the Gaulish -ikno- suffix.

The discovery of the text has substantially increased our knowledge of Gaulish grammar, due to its being one of the very few inscriptions containing fully formed sentences with finite verbal forms, and due to its "feminine" nature containing numerous forms of the first declension (a-stems) otherwise unattested. It is also important in terms of core vocabulary, among other things it is our only source for the Gaulish word for "daughter", duχtir, and as evidence for certain phonological developments of the language.

Text
The inscription is in two hands, labelled M and N (N being the later, responsible for deleting parts of the original text)
The text of N is preserved in its entirety, on the six first lines on side b of the second fragment; parts of the original text of M have been lost. Robert Marichal identifies M as a "habitual" scribe, perhaps a professional, while the writing of N is inexpert and laborious.

The text contains a curse against one Severa Tertionicna and a group of women, presumably her followers. Adgagsona seems to be the name of the principal goddess invoked for the purposes of the curse. 
A total of eleven or twelve names of women who were to be cursed alongside Severa Tertionicna have been preserved; most of these are identified by their given name plus a specification of a relation, identified either by one of their parents ("daughter of"), or one of their children ("mother of"), or as dona (of unclear significance, apparently "lady of", but Lambert suggested "wetnurse of" and Lejeune suggested "heiress of").
The list of names is:

1. Bano[na] Flatucias 
2. Paulla dona Potiti[us]  
3. Aia duχtir Adiegias 
4. Potita, m[atir] Paullias  
5. Seuera du[χtir] Valentos do(n)a Paulli[us] 
6. Adiega matir Aiias 
7. Potita dona Primius [...] Abesias   
[8. Eiotinios?]
9. Ruficna Casta dona [Ba]nonus  
10. Diligentim Vlationicnom  
11. Aucitioni(m) materem Potiti  
12. Vlatucia mat[ir] Banonias

Some of the women in the list seem to be related to one another; Lejeune suggested that this does not necessarily mean that they are biological mothers and daughters, but that the tablet might instead reveal the structure of the sorceresses' organisation, where an older member would initiate a younger novice, and the two women would be considered "mother" and "daughter" for the purposes of their order. 
Orel (Studia Celtica 31, 1997) pointed out that dona is always followed by a proper name in -ius, while matir and duχtir are followed by forms in -ias, i.e. genitive singular), suggesting that the -ius may represent the instrumental plural case (< -ōis), indicating clans or families rather than individuals. Based on this hypothesis, Orel makes out five such (magical) "clans"  from the list,
A: Rufena Casta (9); daughter Banona (1) and mother Flatucia (12)
B: daughter Aia (3) and mother Adiega (6)
C: Severa (5); daughter Paulla (2), mother Potita (4) and mother's mother Abesa
D: daughter Severa (5), mother Valenta 
E: Potita (7); Prima

See also
Chamalières tablet
Bath curse tablets

Notes

References 

Michel Lejeune, Léon Fleuriot, Pierre-Yves Lambert, Robert Marichal, Alain Vernhet, Le plomb magique du Larzac et les sorcières gauloises, C.N.R.S., Paris, 1985, . reprint in Études celtiques, XXII, pp. 88–177.
Xavier Delamarre, Dictionnaire de la langue gauloise, Paris, Errance, 2003.
Pierre-Yves Lambert, La langue gauloise, Paris, Errance, 2003.
F. Melmoth, « Épigraphie gauloise », in: « Parlez-vous Gaulois ? », L'Archéologue, n° 59, 2002, pp. 22–25.
Bernard Mees, The Women of Larzac, Keltische Forschungen 3, 2008, 169-188 (academia.edu).

Further reading
 Dupraz, Emmanuel. "Sur la formule d’introduction du Plomb du Larzac". In: Etudes Celtiques, vol. 39, 2013. pp. 193–210. [DOI: https://doi.org/10.3406/ecelt.2013.2407]; [www.persee.fr/doc/ecelt_0373-1928_2013_num_39_1_2407]

External links
Michaël Martin, Les Plombs Magiques de la Gaule Meridionale (etudesmagiques.info) (2012), pp. 8–10.
D. Stifter, Old Celtic Languages (univie.ac.at)) (2008), p. 147f.
L'Arbre Celtique.

2nd-century inscriptions
1983 archaeological discoveries
Celtic archaeological artifacts
Gaulish inscriptions
Curse tablets
Gallo-Roman religion
Archaeological discoveries in France
Aveyron
Lead objects